Adnan Hassan Mahmoud (born 1966) is the former minister of information of Syria.

Early life and education
Mahmoud was born in Tartus in 1966. He earned a bachelor's degree in media arts from the University of Damascus in 1988 and master's degree in public information st the department of information of the University of Cairo in 1996 and a PhD in media again from the University of Cairo in 2003.

Career
Mahmoud was a faculty member at the department of media of Damascus University. He participated in several Arab and international conferences and symposia, specialized media, and provided research and applied studies and worked as a reporter for radio and television and director of the office of the tongue in Egypt from 1996 to 2002. He was general manager and chief editor of the Syrian Arab News Agency from 2004 until his appointment as information minister in April 2006. He succeeded Mohsen Bilal as minister. After leaving office, Mahmoud was appointed Syria's ambassador to Iran in December 2012.

Sanctions
Mahmoud was sanctioned by the United Kingdom on 2 August 2011, targeting his financial assets in the country. The European Union also sanctioned him on 23 September 2011, stating he was "associated with the Syrian regime, including by supporting and promoting its information policy."

Personal life
Mahmoud is married with two children.

References

1966 births
Living people
Cairo University alumni
Damascus University alumni
Syrian ministers of information
Academic staff of Damascus University
Ambassadors of Syria to Iran
People from Tartus